Pioneer Valley Regional School is a public regional comprehensive secondary school located in Northfield, Massachusetts, United States. It offers grades seven through twelve. It is the primary high school for the towns of Leyden, Northfield, Warwick and Bernardston, Massachusetts. It is also an alternative for students from the neighboring town of Vernon, Vermont. The school was founded in 1776.

History
The Pioneer Valley School District was formed in 1991 following an agreement by the four towns involved: Leyden, Northfield, Warwick, and Bernardston. All four elementary schools fed into Pioneer until the closure of Leyden and Warwick elementary schools. 

A second expansion was made in 1992, expanding the high school portion and overhauling the auditorium.

Governance
Since the formation of the Pioneer Valley Regional School District, Pioneer Valley Regional School has fallen under the jurisdiction of the district's twelve-member school committee, made up of three members from each of the four towns. Though students from Vernon, Vermont are allowed to attend Pioneer, Vernon has no seat at the committee.

Notable alumni
Brad Baker, former professional baseball player
Adam Harrington, former professional basketball player and coach

References

External links
 School website
 School district website

Educational institutions established in 1957
Public high schools in Massachusetts
Public middle schools in Massachusetts
Schools in Franklin County, Massachusetts
1957 establishments in Massachusetts